Cikarang Station (CKR) is a railway station located at Karangasih, North Cikarang, West Java in Indonesia. Previously the station was only served by regional train services between West Java and Jakarta. It is included in the service area of Jakarta metro commuter rail since October 2017.

At present the station serves as the terminal stop for Jakarta metro commuter rail Blue Line. Regional train services such as Jatiluhur (runs between these station and ) and Walahar Express (Cikarang to ) continue to serve this station. On the other hand, Manggarai to Cikarang Double Double Track (DDT) project is expected to be completed in 2020. Cikarang Station is located east of Cikarang river. A market also stands behind the station building.

History 
Cikarang Station was first opened by Bataviasche Oosterspoorweg Maatschappij (BOS) on 14 August 1890, and became an integral part of the opening of the Batavia to Karawang segment of the railroad network. At that time, the building still had the status of a railway stop with the Tjikarang railway stop and only had two railway lines in its emplacement.  After the entire BOS rail network was acquired by Staatsspoorwegen, around the 1920s the number of lines increased to four. This increase allows Bumel trains to pick up and drop off passengers and goods at the Tjikarang railway stop. This transportation activity causes the area around it to become crowded, as evidenced by the existence of markets, barracks, dogcart terminals, and localization.

As time goes by, the role of the railway stop is increasing with the addition of a special rail line behind the railway stop building. The rail line has the status of a buffer stop and is focused on loading and unloading of goods, such as; rice, teak leaves, wood, salt, and livestock transportation. This loading and unloading activity reached its peak in the 1970s to 1980s. Particularly for livestock transportation, the loading and unloading activities continued at least until .

In the early 1990s, the Ministry of Transportation had planned to build a Jabodetabek outer ring rail network that would connect this station with Parungpanjang Station, Citayam Station, and Sungai Lagoa Station. One of the goals is to minimize freight trains crossing urban areas in Jakarta. At first the plan went quite well with the completion of the Citayam to Nambo rail network segment, but the 1997 Asian financial crisis made this plan stopped halfway.

Building and layout 

Cikarang Station is located east of the Cikarang River and behind Pasar Lama. In addition, not far from this station there are also the Toapekong (Chinatown) and Kaum (Kauman) areas.  A few hundred meters east-northeast of this station has always been known as Tangsi. Thus this station has played an important role in the development of the Cikarang area in the past.

With the Doubled-Double Track (quadruple-track railway) project between this station and Manggarai Station, the station building was renovated on a large scale starting in 2014. The first phase of renovations focused on electrification across Bekasi Station to Cikarang, adding new buildings on the south side, and adding four new rail lines on the south side, especially for KRL Commuterline. In addition, a new bridge was also built which contains two rail lines over the river which are located next to the old bridge. The first phase of the renovation lasted until mid-2017 and then was inaugurated on September 17 2017, simultaneously with the extension of the KRL Commuterline network. The extension of the KRL network from Jakarta Kota Station to Cikarang resulted in the addition of three new stations to serve commuter passengers, namely Metland Telagamurni, Cibitung and Bekasi Timur Stations.

After the construction of the south side is completed, from June 2020 to July 2021 the construction of the north side of the Cikarang Station building will be carried out by temporarily dismantling the four old lines. This demolition had an impact on rail traffic which was directed towards the south side. This temporary demolition aims to facilitate construction activities as well as extend the platform, which allows long-distance trains ( (KAJJ)) to stop at this station. Apart from that, at the east end of the station emplacement there is also a stabling yard to store the KRL series.

As of 23 August 2021 the four old lines have returned to operation, so the number of train lines at this station has increased to eight lines with the change in number from the old lines 1-4 to lines 5-8. Since December 2021, the old electrical signaling system has been replaced with a new one produced by PT Len Industri.

Starting on 19 January 2022, the building on the north side of the station began to fully operational. Since then, the Walahar Ekspres and Jatiluhur Ekspres train stops have been moved to line 5. Then, starting 1 February 2022, these stations will start serving long-distance train passengers.

Services
The following is a list of train services at the Cikarang Station.

Passenger services 
 KAI Commuter
  Cikarang Loop Line (Full Racket), to Cikarang (looping through -- and vice versa)
  Cikarang Loop Line (Half Racket), to / (via  and )
 Walahar, to 
 Jatiluhur, to

Gallery

References

External links
 

Bekasi Regency
Railway stations in West Java